Rämö is a Finnish surname. Notable people with the surname include:

 Juuso Rämö (born 1994), Finnish professional ice hockey player
 Karri Rämö (born 1986), Finnish professional ice hockey goaltender
 Mikko Rämö (born 1980), Finnish professional ice hockey goaltender

Finnish-language surnames